JS Asayuki (DD-132) was a  of the Japanese Maritime Self-Defense Force.

Development and design 

Adopting Japan's first all-gas turbine engine (COGOG), equipped with well-balanced weapons such as helicopters, C4I systems, and various missiles, it is inferior to Western frigate at that time. It has been evaluated as a non-escort ship. Twelve ships were built as first-generation general-purpose escort vessels in the era of eight ships and eight aircraft, they supported the escort fleet for a long time, but now they are gradually retiring due to aging.

In addition, there are many changes to training ships, and up to three ships have been operated in the training fleet as Shimayuki-class training ships, but the decline has begun with the conversion of Hatakaze-class destroyers to training ships.

The core of the combat system is the OYQ-5 Tactical Data Processing System (TDPS), composed of one AN/UYK-20 computer and five OJ-194B workstations and capable of receiving data automatically from other ships via Link-14 (STANAG 5514).

This is the first destroyer class in the JMSDF equipped with the Sea Sparrow Improved basic point defense missile system. The IBPDMS of this class uses FCS-2 fire-control systems of Japanese make and one octuple launcher at the afterdeck. And in the JMSDF, OTO Melara 76 mm compact gun and Boeing Harpoon surface-to-surface missile are adopted from the ship of FY1977 including this class. Also, ships built in FY1979 and beyond carried Phalanx CIWS and were retrofitted to previous ships.

Construction and career 
The vessel was laid down on 22 December 1983 and launched on 16 October 1985 at Sumitomo Heavy Industries Shipyard in Uraga. Asayuki commissioned on 20 February 1987.

In 1990, she and JS Haruna left Sasebo for San Diego and Pearl Harbor for Exercise RIMPAC 1990.

From 21 March to 22 April 2014, the destroyer participated in the 2013 open sea practice voyage (flight) with the escort ship . From 15 March to 28 May 2016, Asayuki participated in the Japan-Australia joint training conducted in the waters around Sydney with the escort ship  and the submarine . On 16 November 2020, Asayuki was removed from the naval register. The final affiliation was the 13th escort fleet of the escort fleet, and the homeport was Sasebo.

Gallery

References

1985 ships
Ships built by Sumitomo Heavy Industries
Hatsuyuki-class destroyers